is a Japanese footballer who plays as a  forward for Ehime FC in the J2 League.

Career

Nagoya Grampus
Matsuda made his official debut for Oita Trinita in the J. League Division 1 on 22 May 2013 against Sagan Tosu in Best Amenity Stadium in Tosu, Japan. He played the full match in where his team lost 2-3.

Personal life
His father is Indonesian and his mother is Japanese.
His twin brother Riku is also a soccer player, and is a full-back of Cerezo Osaka.

Club statistics
Updated to end of 2018 season.

References

External links 
Profile at Avispa Fukuoka 

1991 births
Living people
Biwako Seikei Sport College alumni
Association football people from Osaka Prefecture
Japanese footballers
Japanese people of Indonesian descent
Sportspeople of Indonesian descent
J1 League players
J2 League players
J3 League players
Oita Trinita players
Nagoya Grampus players
JEF United Chiba players
Avispa Fukuoka players
Ventforet Kofu players
Cerezo Osaka players
Ehime FC players
Association football forwards